Vinton High School is a Title I public high school located in the city of Vinton, Louisiana. It is a part of Calcasieu Parish Public Schools. The school colors are red and blue, and the Principal is Eric Heinen. The school had an enrollment of 296 for the 2020-21 school year. Students are offered dual enrollment at Sulphur High School to take Advanced Placement courses.

Athletics 
Vinton High athletics competes in the LHSAA. The current athletic director of the school is Mitch Manuel. 

The following sports teams are offered to Vinton High School students:
Baseball (varsity, junior varsity, freshman)
Softball (varsity, junior varsity)
Boys basketball (varsity, junior varsity)
Girls basketball (varsity, junior varsity)
Gridiron football (varsity, junior varsity)
Volleyball (varsity)
Boys soccer (varsity)
Girls soccer (varsity)
Boys track and field (varsity)
Girls track and field (varsity)
Boys wrestling (varsity)

References

Schools in Calcasieu Parish, Louisiana
Public high schools in Louisiana